Senator Byron may refer to:

Goodloe Byron (1929–1978), Maryland State Senate
William D. Byron (1895–1941), Maryland State Senate